Mesothen albifrons is a moth of the subfamily Arctiinae. It was described by Schaus in 1901. It is found in Colombia.

References

 Natural History Museum Lepidoptera generic names catalog

Mesothen (moth)
Moths described in 1901